Deborah Rodriguez may refer to:

 Deborah Rodriguez (writer), American writer and humanitarian
 Déborah Rodríguez (athlete), Uruguayan athlete and fashion model
 Deborah Rodríguez (karateka), a bronze medal winner in Karate at the 2010 Central American and Caribbean Games